The Broadway Theater District in the Historic Core of Downtown Los Angeles is the first and largest historic theater district listed on the National Register of Historic Places (NRHP).  With twelve movie palaces located along a six-block stretch of Broadway, it is the only large concentration of movie palaces left in the United States. The same six-block stretch of Broadway, and an adjacent section of Seventh Street, was also the city's retail hub for the first half of the twentieth century, lined with large and small department stores and specialty stores. 

NRHP refers to the district as the Broadway Theater and Commercial District, while the City of Los Angeles Planning Department refers to the Broadway Theater and Entertainment District.

Highest concentration of movie palaces in the world
Stretching for six blocks from Third to Ninth Streets along South Broadway in Downtown Los Angeles, the district includes 12 movie theaters built between 1910 and 1931. By 1931, the district had the highest concentration of cinemas in the world, with seating capacity for more than 15,000 patrons. Broadway was the hub of L.A.'s entertainment scene – a place where "screen goddesses and guys in fedoras rubbed elbows with Army nurses and aircraft pioneers."  In 2006, the Los Angeles Times wrote:"There was a time, long ago, when the streets of downtown Los Angeles were awash in neon—thanks to a confluence of movie theaters the world had never seen before.  Dozens of theaters screened Hollywood's latest fare, played host to star-studded premieres and were filled nightly with thousands of moviegoers.  In those days, before World War II, downtown L.A. was the movie capital of the world."

Columnist Jack Smith called it "the only large concentration of vintage movie theaters left in America."   Smith recalled growing up a mile from Broadway and spending his Saturdays in the theaters:"I remember walking into those opulent interiors, surrounded by the glory of the Renaissance, or the age of Baroque, and spending two or three hours in the dream world of the movies.  When I came out again the sky blazed; the heat bounced off the sidewalk, traffic sounds filled the street, I was back in the hard reality of the Depression.

Because Broadway has been used as a filming location for decades, many of these theatre marquees can be seen in classic Hollywood films, including Safety Last! (1923), D.O.A. (1950), The Omega Man (1971), Blade Runner (1982), and The Artist (2011).

Revitalization by Spanish-language cinema
In the years after World War II, the district began to decline, as first-run movie-goers shifted to the movie palaces in Hollywood, in Westwood Village, and later to suburban multiplexes.  After World War II, as Anglo moviegoers moved to the suburbs, many of the Broadway movie palaces became venues for Spanish-language movies and variety shows.  In 1988, the Los Angeles Times noted that, without the Hispanic community, "Broadway would be dead."  Jack Smith wrote that Broadway had been "rescued and revitalized" by "the Latino renaissance."

Preservation and renovation efforts
The district has been the subject of preservation and restoration efforts since the 1980s.  In 1987, the Los Angeles Conservancy started a program called "Last Remaining Seats" in which the old movie palaces were opened each summer to show classic Hollywood movies.  In 1994, the Conservancy's associate director, Gregg Davidson, noted: "When we started this, the naysayers said no one will go downtown to an old theater to see an old movie in the middle of the summer, but we get a number of people who have never seen a movie in a theater with a balcony.  The older people (go) for nostalgia.  And the movie people—seeing a classic film on a big screen is a different experience."  After attending a Conservancy screening, one writer noted: "The other night I went to the movies and was transported to a world of powdered wigs and hoop skirts, a rococo fantasy of gilded cherubs and crystal chandeliers.  And then the film started."

Despite preservation efforts, many of the theaters have been converted to other uses, including flea markets and churches.  The Broadway movie palaces fell victim to a number of circumstances, including changing demographics and tastes, a downtown location that was perceived as dangerous at night, and high maintenance costs for aging facilities.  With the closure of the State Theater in 1998, the Orpheum and the Palace were the only two still screening films.

In 2006, the Los Angeles Times wrote: "Of all of L.A.'s many hidden gems, maybe none is as sparkling nor as hidden as the Broadway theater district downtown."  Bemoaning the possible loss of such gems, the same writer noted: "L.A. gave birth to the movies.  To lose the astonishing nurseries where the medium grew up would be tragic."

In 2008, the City of Los Angeles launched a $40-million campaign to revitalize the Broadway district, known as the "Bringing Back Broadway" campaign.  Some Latino merchants in the district expressed concern that the campaign was an effort to spread the largely Anglo gentrification taking hold in other parts of downtown to an area that has become the city's leading Latino shopping district.  A worker at one of the district's bridal shops noted, "On one side, I like the idea.  The only thing is that I don't think they want our types of businesses."

Theatres

Surviving theaters on Broadway
The twelve theaters in the Broadway District from north to south are:

Million Dollar Theater – Movie palace – Located at 307 S. Broadway, the Million Dollar Theater was built by Sid Grauman and opened in 1918. The theater was designed by architects Albert C. Martin and William Lee Woollett with a fanciful facade in the Churrigueresque style. After more than 30 years as one of the city's most prestigious first-run movie palaces, the Million Dollar Theater presented Spanish-language films and variety shows from 1950 until the late 1980s. The theater had a seating capacity of 2,345 when it opened in 1918. In 1925, Ben-Hur played for six months at the Million Dollar Theater.

Roxie Theatre – Movie palace – Located at 518 S. Broadway, the Roxie was built in 1932—the last of the movie palaces built on Broadway. The Roxie had a seating capacity of 1,600 when it opened and was noted for its Art Deco or Zigzag Moderne style, including its stepped roofline, angular grillwork, chevron ornament, and terrazzo sunburst in the sidewalk. The theater's sleek Streamline Moderne ticket booth was removed when the theater was converted to retail use.
Cameo Theater – Nickelodeon – Located at 528 S. Broadway, the Cameo opened in 1910 with a seating capacity of 775. Designed by Alfred Rosenheim in a Renaissance Revival style, the Cameo was originally known as Clune's Broadway. Until it closed in 1991, it was the oldest continuously operating movie theater in California. The Cameo has been converted into a swap meet-type market.
Arcade Theater – English-music-hall-style theater – Located at 534 S. Broadway, the Arcade opened in 1910 as a vaudeville house that was part of the Pantages vaudeville circuit. The Arcade was designed by Morgan & Walls in the Beaux Arts style with tripartite vertical division of the facade. Theater has been closed since 1992. Currently used as retail space. 

Los Angeles Theatre – Movie palace – Located at 615 S. Broadway, the Los Angeles opened in 1931 for the premiere of Charlie Chaplin's City Lights. It had a seating capacity just short of 2,000. The theater was designed by S. Charles Lee and S. Tilden Norton in the French Baroque style, and was modeled on San Francisco's Fox Theater. The Los Angeles included the latest technological features when it opened, including an electric monitor of available seats, blue neon floor lights, a restaurant, a children's playroom,  soundproof crying rooms, smoking room with built-in cigarette lighters, a walnut-paneled lounge with a secondary screen on which a periscope-like system of prisms relayed the film. The ladies' powder room was lined with mirrors and vanities, and the toilet stalls were each done in a different kind of marble and each toilet bowl of a different pastel shade. In 1988, the Los Angeles Times Dan Sullivan called it "a movie house for the gods, even in its present dusty state". Columnist Jack Smith wrote that the Los Angeles Theater was "palatial beyond the dreams of a prince" with a lobby that suggested "nothing less than the glory of Versailles.". Aerosmith's video for "Jaded" was filmed throughout the theater. It is owned by the Broadway Theatre Group, and continues to be used as a performing arts venue. Current capacity: 1,931.

Palace Theatre – Vaudeville theater and movie palace – Located at 630 S. Broadway, the Palace opened in 1911 with a seating capacity of 2,200. It was an Orpheum vaudeville theater from 1911–1926 and is the oldest remaining Orpheum theater in the United States. The structure was designed by G. Albert Lansburgh based on a Florentine early Renaissance palazzo. The brick facade includes multi-colored terra-cotta swags and four panels depicting the muses of vaudeville sculpted by Domingo Mora. It is also owned by the Broadway Theatre Group. Current capacity: 1,068.

State Theatre – Vaudeville theater and movie palace – Located at 703 S. Broadway, The State opened in 1921 with a seating capacity of 2,450. The theater offered both film and vaudeville when it opened. Judy Garland performed at the theater as part of the Gumm Sisters in 1929. Designed by Charles Weeks and William Day, the 12-story Loew's State is said to be the largest brick-clad structure in Los Angeles. The theater is also noted for the seated Buddha/Billiken figure, as a good luck charm, located in a niche above the proscenium arch. The exterior has an elaborate "silver platter" chased ornamentation above the ground story. In 1998, Metropolitan Theaters stopped showing movies at the State and leased the space to the Universal Church. As of 2015 the State is owned by the Broadway Theatre Group and is leased by the Cathedral of Faith for use as a church.
Globe Theatre – Legitimate theater – Located at 744 S. Broadway, the Globe opened in 1913 as the Morosco Theatre, with a seating capacity of 782. Built for impresario Oliver Morosco and designed by the architectural firm of Morgan, Walls & Morgan, it was used for full-scale live dramatic theater. It was converted into a movie theater during the Great Depression and later served as a Spanish-language movie theater. The building was converted into a swap meet in 1987. , construction to restore it to use as an entertainment venue is ongoing. The restored marquee was relit June 24, 2014. The Globe is now a multipurpose space for music, theatrical events and films. Current capacity: 2,000.

Tower Theatre – Movie theater – Located at 802 S. Broadway, the Tower opened in 1927 with a seating capacity of 1,000. It was the first of more than 70 theaters designed by S. Charles Lee, who described the Tower as a "modified French Renaissance" design. It was the first movie theater in Downtown Los Angeles equipped to accommodate talking pictures. It is now owned by the Broadway Theatre Group. The space was refurbished in 2021 for an Apple Store.

Rialto Theater – Movie theater – Located at 812 S. Broadway, the Rialto opened as Quinn's Rialto, a nickelodeon, in 1917. It was purchased by Sid Grauman in 1919, the year after he opened the Million Dollar Theater. Today the theater is home to an Urban Outfitters store.

Orpheum Theatre – Vaudeville theater and movie palace – Located at 842 S. Broadway, the Orpheum opened in 1926 as the fourth Los Angeles home for the Orpheum vaudeville circuit. Architect G. Albert Lansburgh designed the François Premier style interior. The Orpheum has hosted performances by Jack Benny, Eddie Cantor, Sophie Tucker, Will Rogers, Count Basie, Duke Ellington, the Marx Brothers, and Lena Horne. In the 1990s, Tom Hanks used the Orpheum as a substitute for the Orpheum in Pittsburgh for his film That Thing You Do. The Orpheum has also been featured in the Guns N' Roses video, "November Rain," and in the Sean Penn-produced video for Jewel's "You Were Meant for Me". In 2006, the film Dreamgirls was shot at the Orpheum. The television series  So You Think You Can Dance and American Idol have used the Orpheum for Los Angeles auditions, and Idol has televised its early elimination rounds from the theater.

United Artists Theater (now The Theatre at Ace Hotel) – Movie palace – Located at 933 S. Broadway, the United Artists opened in 1927 with a seating capacity of 2,214. It was the showcase for movies from the United Artists group created in 1919 by Charlie Chaplin, Mary Pickford, Douglas Fairbanks and D.W. Griffith. The theater was designed by C. Howard Crane, with Walker & Eisen, in a Gothic style inspired by a church in Segovia, Spain. The columns feature terra cotta capitals carved with film and theater themed grotesques. The interior includes a series of frescoes and murals by the firm of Anthony Heinsbergen. In 1990, the United Artists Theater was restored by Gene Scott's L.A. University Church; Scott called on his television flock to come to Los Angeles to help with the restoration. Scott's famous "Jesus Saves" sign was placed on the back side of the building to avoid interfering with the original facade. In 2013 the upper floors of the building were renovated into a boutique hotel, the Ace Los Angeles; the auditorium has been returned to use as a concert venue and theater.

Other surviving theaters in the vicinity
Warner Bros. Downtown Theatre – Vaudeville theater and movie palace – Located at 401 W. 7th St (northwest corner of South Hill and West 7th St). Opening on August 17, 1920, it was originally called the Pantages Theatre, but was renamed Warner Bros. Downtown Theatre in 1930 after the Hollywood Pantages Theatre was opened. The exterior has an imposing domed corner tower, flanked by twin facades on 7th and Hill. Later in the 1960s, it was known as the Warrens Theatre. It currently houses the Jewelry Theater Center, a marketplace of jewelry vendors.
Olympic Theatre – Movie palace – Located at 313 W. 8th St, half a block from S. Broadway, it originally opened in 1927 as Bard's 8th Street Theatre, converted from a restaurant. For a time, it had a second entrance on Broadway. After a period as a chandelier store, COS, a higher-end brand of H&M, began remodeling the store in  2016.
Mayan Theater – Vaudeville theater and movie palace – Located at 1014 South Hill Street. Opened in August 1927 and now designated a Historic Cultural Monument, the Mayan is currently used as a nightclub. Current capacity: 1,491
Belasco Theatre – Legitimate theater – Located at 1050 South Hill Street, adjacent to the Mayan. Built by the Belasco brothers, and designed by Morgan, Walls and Clements. It served as a church from 1950 to 1987, renovations were completed in 2011 to modernize the sound and lighting systems. Current capacity: 1,601.

Demolished theaters

Some of the demolished theaters in and adjacent to the district were:

Majestic Theatre, 845 S. Broadway, opened 1908, 1,600 seats, originally built for Asher Hamburger, architects Edelman & Barnett, interior decoration by Antoon Molkenboernl, demolished 1933, site of a parking lot until the 2010s, now a complex of high-end fashion stores.
Mason Theatre, 127 S. Broadway. Opened in 1903 as the Mason Opera House, 1,600 seats. Remodeled in 1924 by Meyer & Holler. Later, as the Mason Theatre, it showed Spanish-language films. Demolished 1955.
Paramount Theatre, opened as Grauman’s Metropolitan Theatre, northeast corner of 6th and Hill streets. Opened 1923, closed 1960, demolished 1962. Site of the 16-story International Jewelry Center office building, opened in 1981.
 RKO Hillstreet Theatre, 801 S. Hill St., southwest corner of 8th and Hill, opened 1922, architect G. Albert Lansburgh, closed 1963, demolished 1965. Now the site is part of the 820 Olive residential and retail complex.

See also

List of Registered Historic Places in Los Angeles
Broadway (Los Angeles) - commercial and other buildings contributing to the historic districts
Central Business District, Los Angeles (1880-1899) - business district of Los Angeles north of 3rd Street before it moved south along Broadway

References

External links

The Broadway Theater Tour
Bringing Back Broadway Plan

Theatres in Los Angeles
History of Los Angeles
Historic districts in Los Angeles
National Register of Historic Places in Los Angeles
Downtown Los Angeles
Historic districts on the National Register of Historic Places in California
Los Angeles